Zar Lawrence (b. 9 February 1982. Kaitaia, New Zealand) is a New Zealand Rugby union player who plays for the New Zealand Sevens team internationally, and for Bay of Plenty in the ITM Cup.

Career highlights
New Zealand Sevens 2005–present
NZ Maori 2006
North Harbour 2004 – 2006
North Harbour Sevens 2005
North Harbour Under 21 2003

References
 Sevens Profile

New Zealand rugby union players
Living people
1982 births
Māori All Blacks players
New Zealand international rugby sevens players
Ngāpuhi people
People from Kaitaia